Azagury is a Moroccan surname. Notable people with the surname include: 

Elie Azagury (1918-2009), Moroccan architect
Jacques Azagury, Moroccan-born fashion designer
Solange Azagury-Partridge, British designer

Surnames of Moroccan origin